Williamsburg is a home rule-class city in and the county seat of Whitley County, on the southeastern border of Kentucky, United States. The population was 5,245 at the 2010 census. Developed along the Cumberland River, the city was founded in 1818 and named after William Whitley.

History

Williamsburg was first known by early European-American settlers as the Spring Ford, after a nearby ford crossing the Cumberland River. On April 19, 1818 the first meeting of the Whitley County Court was held at Samuel Cox's dwelling. This first court appointed local officials as well as constables to work with the county militia. The town was known simply as Whitley Courthouse. In 1882 the city was renamed as Williamsburgh, and the spelling was changed in 1890 to the current Williamsburg.

The town's initial growth was fueled by three freshwater springs in the area. Settlers were attracted to this water source. They later developed coal mining and lumber industries, based on natural resources of the area.

Construction of the Louisville and Nashville Railroad (L&N) to the town in 1883 stimulated new growth. It connected the town to far-flung markets and attracted new residents and trade. Shortly thereafter in 1886 the town elected W. H. Parker as its first mayor.

This first city government enacted a number of new ordinances including:

 Prohibiting "Bawdy Houses" (brothels)
 Prohibiting Gambling
 Prohibiting Fornication
 Prohibiting Rolling Hoops on Sidewalks
 Prohibiting Barbering on Sundays 
 Prohibiting Unattended Cattle on Main Street

The Williamsburg school system was established in 1909; the town residents voted to consolidate the multiple single-room schools in the area into a unified school district. The first consolidated school building was destroyed by fire in 1926. It was rebuilt for the school administration. Later the structure was adapted as the Anderson Building, which is used in the early 21st century by the University of the Cumberlands. The school district moved to its current location in 1983.

The county courthouse was destroyed by fire in 1931. It was rebuilt at the time. Forty years later, it underwent a major renovation to bring it up to standards of 1971. In 2011 the newly constructed Whitley County Judicial Center was completed adjacent to the old courthouse, and the courts moved to the new building.

Geography
It rests along the I-75 corridor at exits 11 and 15. I-75 leads north 103 mi (166 km) to Lexington and south 70 mi (113 km) to Knoxville, Tennessee. U.S. Route 25W runs to the east of downtown from south to north, leading north 21 mi (34 km) to Corbin and south 13 mi (21 km) to Jellico, Tennessee. Kentucky Route 92 runs through the city from west to east, leading east 35 mi (56 km) to Fourmile and west 20 mi (32 km) to Pine Knot.

Percent of U.S. within  of Williamsburg:
 Population: 52%
 Personal Income: 50%
 Retail Sales: 49%
 Manufacturing Employment: 57%

Points of interest

Williamsburg is home to the Kentucky Splash Waterpark (located within the Hal Rogers Family Entertainment Center). The $5 million facility also houses a go-cart course, a miniature golf course, and a five-station batting cage. The park opened on Memorial Day weekend 2001 and is the largest family entertainment center in Kentucky with a capacity of up to 3,000 guests.

The park is the home of Cumberland Falls, sometimes called the Little Niagara, the Niagara of the South or the Great Falls and is the only venue in the Western Hemisphere where a moonbow or lunar rainbow is regularly visible on a clear night with a full moon. The Below the Falls section of the river includes a five-mile (8 km) long class 2–3 run that is ideal for families and beginner stage white water rafters and kayakers.

Williamsburg is located 20 minutes away from the Big South Fork of the Cumberland River, a major tributary of the Cumberland River system and a class 3–4 whitewater canoeing and kayaking stream. The Big South Fork is also home to Yahoo Falls, which stand 113 feet (34.8 m) high. Further along, the trail leads to the Yahoo Arch.

Williamsburg is also home to one of the top bluegrass festivals in the state of Kentucky (the Sally Gap Bluegrass Festival). Other events are the Jeep Jamboree (an off-road sporting event), and the Border Bowl, an annual event for two teams of high school footballers representing Kentucky and Tennessee.

Religion
As of the 2000 census Whitley County, Kentucky of which Williamsburg is the county seat consisted of 22,645 Evangelical Christians, 1,741 Mainline Christians, 130 Catholics, and 11,394 individuals who are not members of the 188 groups included in the Churches & Church Membership Data. As of the same date 69.4% of individuals in Whitley County were members of the Southern Baptist Convention. Williamsburg boasts 21 religious institutions or one religious institution per 243 citizens, and as of the year 2000 the region that contains the town has been designated the second densest region of the bible belt. University of the Cumberlands, located in the town, is a private Christian college affiliated with the Kentucky Baptist Convention, a member of the Southern Baptist Convention.

Economy
Top Employers:
 Firestone Industrial Products
 Whitley County School System
 Williamsburg Plastics
 University of The Cumberlands
 Southeastern Kentucky Rehabilitation Industries (SEKRI)
 Computer Sciences Corporation (CSC)
 Walmart
 Kentucky Consular Center

Demographics

As of the census of 2000, there were 5,143 people, 1,928 households, and 1,127 families residing in the city. The racial makeup of the city was 96.46% White, 1.73% African American, 0.21% Native American, 0.35% Asian, 0.02% Pacific Islander, 0.12% from other races, and 1.11% from two or more races. Hispanic or Latino of any race were 0.66% of the population.

There were 1,928 households, out of which 26.5% had children under the age of 18 living with them, 38.9% were married couples living together, 16.9% had a female householder with no husband present, and 41.5% were non-families. 35.6% of all households were made up of individuals, and 14.6% had someone living alone who was 65 years of age or older. The average household size was 2.20 and the average family size was 2.87.

In the city, the population was spread out, with 19.5% under the age of 18, 24.9% from 18 to 24, 22.2% from 25 to 44, 18.4% from 45 to 64, and 15.0% who were 65 years of age or older. The median age was 30 years. For every 100 females, there were 85.1 males. For every 100 females age 18 and over, there were 80.2 males.

The median income for a household in the city was $18,114, and the median income for a family was $25,996. Males had a median income of $31,905 versus $17,339 for females. The per capita income for the city was $11,224. About 29.3% of the population and 35.4% of the population were below the poverty line, including 49.0% of those under the age of 18 and 15.1% of those ages 65 and older.

Education

K-12
Two public school districts serve the city:
Whitley County Schools
The county school district serves the county outside of the city of Williamsburg, however, its central campus is only a mile outside the city limits.
 Whitley County High School (Grades 9–12)
 Whitley County Middle School (Grades 7–8)
 Whitley Central Intermediate School (Grades 3–6)
 Whitley County Central Primary School (Grades Pre-K-2)
Williamsburg Independent Schools
Serves the city of Williamsburg with a single K-12 school.
Williamsburg Independent School District

In addition, Corbin Education Center serves as an alternative school for students in the Corbin, Williamsburg, and Whitley County school districts.

Colleges and universities

The campus of the University of the Cumberlands (formerly Cumberland College) is located on College Hill adjacent to the downtown area of Williamsburg. UC is a private liberal arts college, with an enrollment of approximately 2,200 students. Its sports teams participate in the NAIA. The school is affiliated with the Kentucky Baptist Convention (the Kentucky affiliate of the Southern Baptist Convention).

Library
Williamsburg has a lending library, the Whitley County Public Library.

Media

Newspapers
News Journal – Weekly
The Times-Tribune – Daily
The Patriot – College newspaper (University of the Cumberlands)

Radio

WCCR-LP 94.5 FM (low power) – College radio (University of the Cumberlands)
WEKX 102.7 FM – Classic Rock
WEZJ 104.3 FM – Country
WEKC 710 AM – Gospel
WEZJ 1440 AM – Country

Notable people
Bert T. Combs, 50th Kentucky governor and University of the Cumberlands alumni
Patricia Neal, stage and screen actress, born in nearby Packard Coal Camp; lived in  Williamsburg's Gatliff House at one point.
Joe C. Paul, United States Marine and Medal of Honor recipient
Eugene Edward Siler, Jr., United States federal appellate judge
Nick Wilson, winner of Survivor: David vs. Goliath

Climate
The climate in this area is characterized by hot, humid summers and generally mild to cool winters.  According to the Köppen Climate Classification system, Williamsburg has a humid subtropical climate, abbreviated "Cfa" on climate maps.

References

External links
 Official website of Williamsburg, Kentucky
 Williamsburg Independent Schools
 University of the Cumberlands

Cities in Kentucky
Cities in Whitley County, Kentucky
County seats in Kentucky
1819 establishments in Kentucky
Populated places established in 1819